George Corrie (born 16 September 1973) is an English footballer, born in Workington, who played for ten years as a midfielder for American USL Second Division side Wilmington Hammerheads, of which he was the captain. He joined the Hammerheads in 1999 after six seasons with Conference North team Workington A.F.C.

References

External links
 2008 article on Star News Online
 2009 article on Star News Online

1973 births
Living people
Sportspeople from Workington
English footballers
Association football midfielders
Workington A.F.C. players
Wilmington Hammerheads FC players
USL Second Division players
English expatriate sportspeople in the United States
Expatriate soccer players in the United States
English expatriate footballers
Footballers from Cumbria